The following is a list of awards and nominations received by James Woods.

Woods is an American actor known for his performances on stage and screen. He has received two Academy Award nominations for Best Actor for his performance as photojournalist Richard Boyle in Oliver Stone's war drama Salvador (1986) and for Best Supporting Actor for his performance as the white supremacist Byron De La Beckwith in the Rob Reiner courtroom drama Ghosts of Mississippi (1996). For his work on television he received eight Primetime Emmy Award nominations winning twice for Outstanding Lead Actor in a Limited Series or Movie for his performances in Promise (1987) and My Name Is Bill W. (1989). For his combined work in film and television he has earned nine Golden Globe Award nominations winning for Golden Globe Award for Best Actor – Miniseries or Television Film for Promise. He has also received three Screen Actors Guild Award and three Independent Spirit Award nominations winning for Independent Spirit Award for Best Male Lead for Salvador.

Major awards

Academy Awards

Golden Globe Awards

Emmy Awards

Screen Actors Guild Awards

Independent Spirit Awards

Theatre awards

Clarence Derwent Award

Theater World Awards

Miscellaneous Awards
On October 15, 1998, Woods was inducted into the Hollywood Walk of Fame with a star at 7021 Hollywood Blvd.

CableACE Awards

Satellite Awards

Saturn Award

Critics awards

Broadcast Film Critics Association

Chicago Film Critics Association

Kansas City Film Critics Circle

Las Vegas Film Critics Society

National Society of Film Critics

New York Film Critics Circle

References

External links

 James Woods at Emmys.com

Woods, James